Zsófia Koncz (born 1990) is a Hungarian politician.

Personal life 
Her father Ferenc Koncz died in 2020, and she replaced him in the National Assembly at the 2020 Tiszaújváros by-election.

References 

Living people
1990 births
21st-century Hungarian politicians
21st-century Hungarian women politicians
Fidesz politicians
Members of the National Assembly of Hungary (2018–2022)
Members of the National Assembly of Hungary (2022–2026)
Women members of the National Assembly of Hungary